El Gallito Airstrip  is a privately owned public-use dirt airstrip at Hotel Serenidad, located 2 miles south of Mulegé, Municipality of Mulegé, Baja California Sur, Mexico, just on the Gulf of California coast. The airstrip is used solely for general aviation purposes.

External links
Official El Gallito Airstrip website
Baja Bush Pilots forum: Mulegé airstrips

Airports in Baja California Sur
Mulegé Municipality